The Christ Rock Methodist Episcopal Church is a historic church building in Dorchester County, Maryland.  It is located across from the Stanley Institute, at the junction of Maryland Route 16 with Rock Drive.  The wood-frame building was built in 1875, and rebuilt in 1889 and 1911.  The church served a congregation of African Americans who migrated to Dorchester County after the American Civil War.

The church was listed on the National Register of Historic Places in 2014, as "Rock Methodist Episcopal Church".

See also
National Register of Historic Places listings in Dorchester County, Maryland

References

External links

, including undated photo, at Maryland Historical Trust

Churches on the National Register of Historic Places in Maryland
Churches in Dorchester County, Maryland
African-American history in Cambridge, Maryland
National Register of Historic Places in Dorchester County, Maryland